A thermal optimum is either a portion of a specified geological time span in which the average temperature was above that of the average temperature for the entire specified time or the optimum range within which a biological process may take place or the ambient optimal range for a species' niche.

In geology, scientists speak of a Holocene thermal optimum or maximum, for example, when referring to the warm period from 7000 to 2500 BC, in which an overall rise in average temperature is seen in evidence from ice cores and from stable isotope data. Scientists are interested in these periods because they may be clues to evolutionary pressures experienced by species during large spans of time.

In biology 
In biology a thermal optimum describes the ideal boundaries for biological processes such as growth and development, and is usually characteristic of a species or population.  Most biological processes are dependent upon enzymatic activity that can be impacted by the organism's body temperature, which in term is a function of the organism's metabolism and environment as each enzyme has a finite window in which it can function properly.  An organism's niche in the environment may then be dependent upon the thermal optima for all of its necessary biological processes.

In animals that inhabit the wave-tossed tidal pools of rocky shores thermal optima vary for each species and dictate the species' tolerance of environmental conditions that lead to increased heating or loss of mechanisms for cooling.  For example, exposure to sunlight when the tide is out, and lack of thermal insulation from the buffering effects of water due to its specific heat capacity may contribute to increased temperature leading to increased desiccation.  An organism that has a high thermal optimum may still be able to function in this environment, while one with a lower thermal optimum may have its metabolic processes shut down during the drying period of exposure.  An organism may be confined to a limited range of habitats due to the population's thermal optima, while another population may have a different range of habitats open to it due to a different thermal optima for its biological processes.  Ultimately the ability to adapt to greater extremes in such a harsh environment as the rocky shores where tide pools are formed may then be discussed in terms of varying environmental thermal optima for different species.  Rising temperatures in the face of stable thermal optima also has implications for parasitic disease transmission and where intervention might become necessary.

References

History of climate variability and change